North Bihar Power Distribution Company Limited is a public sector undertaking (PSU) controlled by the Government of Bihar. It was formed on 1 November 2012 under section 14 of the Electricity Act of 2003, and is the successor to the erstwhile Bihar State Electricity Board.

Infrastructure
The company has an infrastructure facility in its operating area with 246 power system stabilizers, 506 power transformers, 139 33 kV feeders, 825 11 kV feeders and around 20,900 distribution transformers of various capacities.

Network
The company encompasses an area of 21 districts of northern Bihar further divided into 29 divisions: Araria - I, Bagha, Bairagania, Barauli, Barauni, Barsoi, Begusarai, Bettiah, Chhapra, Darbhanga, Forbesganj, Gogari, Gopalganj, Hajipur, Katihar, Khagaria, Mahnar Bazar, Motihari, Narkatiaganj, Purnia, Ramnagar, Revelganj, Samastipur, Sitamarhi, Siwan, Sonpur, Sugauli, Kishanganj, Madhepura, Raxaul. Catering to the power requirements of around 1.8 million consumers in 2012.

See also

Bihar State Power Holding Company Limited
South Bihar Power Distribution Company Limited

References

Electric power distribution network operators in India
Energy in Bihar
State agencies of Bihar
State electricity agencies of India
2012 establishments in Bihar
Energy companies established in 2012